Kshanam is a 2016 Indian Telugu-language mystery thriller film directed by Ravikanth Perepu. The film features Adivi Sesh (who also served as a co-writer of the film) and Adah Sharma in lead roles while Anasuya Bharadwaj, Vennela Kishore, Satyam Rajesh, Satyadev, and Ravi Varma in supporting roles with the music is by Sricharan Pakala and cinematography by Shaneil Deo. In the film, Rishi arrives in India where he begins to search for a missing child of his ex-girlfriend Shwetha.

The film was released on 26 February 2016 where it received positive reviews from critics and audience, where it was remade in Tamil as Sathya (2017), in Hindi as Baaghi 2 (2018) and Kannada as Aadyaa (2020).

Plot 
Rishi, a San Francisco-based investment banker, gets a voice call from his ex-girlfriend Sweta after a long gap. They studied medicine in the same college and wanted to marry, but her father arranged an alliance with an entrepreneur named Karthik. In the present, Rishi, who still loves Sweta, leaves for India on the pretense of attending a relative's marriage. He hires a car from Babu Khan, a travel agent, takes a SIM card on his sister's address and stays at Hotel Marriott. Rishi meets Sweta at a restaurant and learns her five-year-old daughter Riya is missing. She laments that no one else, including Karthik, believes that Riya actually exists. Rishi also learns about Karthik's brother Bobby, a drug addict who regularly visits her home. 

Rishi begins an informal investigation which fails many times, also inviting the ire of two African-American gangsters in the city. Babu, who helps them in transporting drugs, saves Rishi on humanitarian grounds. Posing as Vasanth Khanna, a police officer, Rishi meets Karthik and learns that the couple was childless. Karthik recalls Sweta being attacked by two masked men before a school to steal her car. He added that Sweta went into a coma and post-recovery started claiming that she had a five-year-old daughter named Riya. Perplexed, Rishi later watches a closed-circuit television video footage of the masked men attacking Sweta on the day when Riya went missing. Unfortunately, Riya is seen nowhere in the footage, which makes Rishi doubt Sweta's mental condition. 

Rishi confronts Sweta, who refuses to acknowledge that Riya is imaginary. Rishi sees height markings of a child on a wall, and before he could react, Sweta commits suicide in his presence. ACP Jaya and Inspector Ravi Chowdary investigate the suicide case. Khanna is killed in Marriott, and Babu confesses to Rishi that he saw Bobby kidnapping Riya. They meet Jaya and Chowdary and get Bobby arrested. In custody, Bobby is killed by Jaya in an act of self-defense. The same night, Khanna's murderers attack Babu and Rishi, and Babu is killed in the process of shooting the murderers to death. Rishi watches a MMS in the murderers' phone sent by Jaya instructing to kill him. Rishi meets Jaya at her farmhouse, where Riya is hidden. 

Jaya reveals that Karthik wanted to kill Riya and arranged the attack on Sweta, after which Jaya found Riya in Bobby's custody. After meeting Riya, Jaya conspires to raise the girl as her daughter because she had lost her own husband and unborn daughter in a car accident. Jaya wanted to name her daughter Riya, so when she saw Sweta's daughter, she convinced herself that her daughter has come back. Thus, Jaya made a deal with Karthik; Karthik wanted Sweta to suffer so according to Jaya's plan, he convinced his friends and family to pretend that Riya never existed, saying Sweta cannot bear the shock of her daughter's death. Before Jaya can kill Rishi, Chowdary shoots her after listening to the conversation on his way to the farmhouse with his subordinates. Karthik is arrested and reveals that Riya is not his daughter, as a medical report confirmed him sterile in the past. Rishi remembers his last meeting with Sweta; she visited him to invite him to her wedding, and they made love. Rishi now realises Riya is his biological child. As he approaches Riya, he sees a reflection of Sweta smiling at him.

Cast

Production 
The film's concept was inspired by an incident in actor and filmmaker Adivi Sesh life when he felt scared for a four-year-old girl and her friends at a school in Jubilee Hills, Hyderabad. Sesh wanted to make a thriller film with the missing of a three-year-old being the backdrop. Prasad V Potluri of PVP Cinema agreed to bankroll the film and Sesh's friend Ravikanth Perepu was chosen to direct the film; it marked the latter's debut in Telugu cinema. Sesh and Perepu worked on the screenplay for ten months. Pre-production phase began three months after the scripting work commenced. Sesh and Perepu chose to work with a low budget to make the project a feasible one, considering the genre's appeal. The film's crew consisted of 20 members; two of Perepu's twelfth grade friends were the associate directors.

While writing the script, Sesh and Perepu discussed possibilities for every situation and discarded the first one as it would be a predictable one. Shaneil Deo was the film's director of photography. Sricharan Pakala composed the film's soundtrack and score. Perepu edited the film with Arjun Shastri; Sesh and the associate directors did get involved in the process. Sesh played Rishi, an investment banker who searches for his ex-girlfriend's missing child on her request. He stated that Rishi was modelled on his real self in terms of sensibilities except for the fact that the character is an alcoholic.

Soundtrack 
The music was composed by Sricharan Pakala and released by Junglee Music. The background score of the film was much appreciated with the songs "Cheliya" and "Ee Kshanam" topping the charts.

Release 
Kshanam was released on 26 February 2016 across Telangana and Andhra Pradesh and received critical acclaim and received positive response from the first show.

Home media 
The film's satellite and digital rights were sold to Gemini TV and Sun NXT.

Critical Reception 
Kshanam received positive reviews from critics and audience.

Pranita Jonnalagedda of The Times Of India gave the film 3.5 out of 5 stars and wrote "Kshanam is a film you most definitely shouldn’t miss; afterall it’s not every day that you get to experience something meaningful yet exciting in Telugu cinema". Suresh Kavirayani of Deccan Chronicle gave the film 3.5/5 and wrote "For this kind of genre bgm is very important and Sricharan Pakala hit's the bulls eye.The Cinematography is good and visuals are thrilling but there are some logical flaws". 

123 Telugu gave the film 3.25/5 and wrote "Kshanam ends up as an intense and enjoyable thriller which will not disappoint you at all". Idlebrain gave the film 3.25/5 and wrote "Kshanam is a decent and engaging suspense thriller despite of a couple of unconvincing points". Sangeetha Devi Dundoo of The Hindu stated "Kshanam has a taut screenplay, brings to fore underrated actors and marks a terrific directorial debut".

Box office 
In 10 days since its release, Kshanam grossed about ₹ 4.8 crores at the Telugu (AP and Telangana) Box office. It collected $65,679 (₹ 44.83 lakh) from 27 screens at the US box office in the first weekend. In its second weekend, it collected $28,889 from 20 screens at the US box office and its 10-day total US collection stands at $111,037 (₹ 74.68 lakh).

Remakes 
The film was remade in Tamil as Sathya (2017) directed by Pradeep Krishnamoorty, in Hindi as Baaghi 2 directed by Ahmed Khan and starring Tiger Shroff and Disha Patani, and in Kannada as Aadyaa directed by K. M. Chaitanya.

Accolades

See also 
 Bunny Lake Is Missing (1965)

References

External links 
 

2016 films
2010s Telugu-language films
2010s mystery thriller films
Telugu films remade in other languages
Films about child abduction in India
2016 directorial debut films
Films scored by Sricharan Pakala
2016 thriller films
Indian mystery thriller films
Films set in Andhra Pradesh
Films shot in Andhra Pradesh
Films set in Visakhapatnam
Films shot in Visakhapatnam